The Safe Surrey Coalition is a civic political party in Surrey, British Columbia, Canada.

Members 
 Doug McCallum — Former mayor of Surrey
 Doug Elford 
 Mandeep Nagra

Former Members 
 Bableen Rana 
 Allison Patton
 Laurie Guerra
 Steven Pettigrew
 Brenda Locke — Left to form Surrey Connect
 Jack Handial

Elections 
In the municipal election held on 20 October 2018, the party won all but one seat on the Surrey City Council. That other seat was won by Linda Annis of the Surrey First party. In the municipal election held on 15 October 2022, the party lost all but 2 seats in the Surrey City Council to both Surrey Connect and Surrey First who both campaigned against the disillusion of the Surrey RCMP in favor of the now-cancelled Surrey Police Service.

Mayoral elections

Council elections

References 

Political parties in Canada
Politics of Surrey, British Columbia
Municipal political parties in British Columbia